Vladimir Maximilianovich Landau (September 24, 1971) was a Russian-born Monegasque tennis player. In 1931 he was the 14th on the French rankings, which included players of all nationality provided that they played in and represented a French sports club.

Early life and family
Vladimir Landau was born on March 29, 1902 in Petrograd to Maximilien Landau and Anna Herzenberg. He had a sister Alice who was a famous ballet dancer under the pseudonym Alice Nikitina. After World War I the family moved to Monaco.

Tennis career
In 1928, Landau  reached the quarterfinal of the doubles at Monegasque Championships alongside Ludwig von Salm Hoogstraten. The next year he was defeated in the doubles final of the Beaulieu L.T.C. tournament, partnering with László Dörner of Romania. In the same year he took a major part with his two victories in the first ever Davis Cup tie, a victory of Monaco against Switzerland, and advancing into the second round where they faced Hungary in Budapest. Although they lost, Landau scored both victories of his team. In the 1930 French Championships he was the eleventh seed and was eliminated in the third round. At the Beausite Club de Cannes Cup in January 1931, he won the doubles contest with his teammate Hillyard. A month later, he won a triple crown at the Monte Carlo Country Club tournament beating Hillyard in singles, partnering with him for the doubles victory against Garcia/Chastel and clinching the mixed doubles with British Phyllis Satterthwaite from Garcia/Mrs. Richards. In March he was a runner-up for the Bordighera Championships doubles partnering Béla von Kehrling and only lost to the Irish-Italian duo of George Lyttleton-Rogers and Alberto del Bono. In May in an unofficial challenge between the Davis Cup teams of Monaco and Netherlands his team claimed a clean win with Landau's back-to-back victories over Jan van der Heide, Ody Koopman in two singles and a doubles . 

At the very first tournament of the 1932 season in Beaulieu Landau, assisted by Irish champion Lyttleton-Rogers, earned the doubles title after a five-set battle. In 1934 he ceded the Monegasque Championships to Charles Aeschlimann in straights sets. In 1936 at the Menton tournament he fell to Norcross Tilney in the semifinals. In January 1937 he captured the Beausite L.T.C. doubles trophy with Kho Sin Kie but unfortunately they met in the singles final as well where in the end Kho was triumphant after a five-set battle wrapping the match with a love-set. He also reached the final of the mixed doubles with Simonne Mathieu. In February at the Carlton-Cannes tournaments he aligned with Mrs Merricks and dropped the mixed semifinals to Weiwers and Karstend. In September in Menton in the semifinal encounter between him and compatriot Gaston Médecin he was beaten in two sets but they won the doubles title together.

In the Davis Cup Landau played 15 ties between 1929-1947 and compiled an 11/30 winning record.

Controversies
In April 1947 Landau was summoned to court and to testify in the case of an English lady named Edna Clayton who was accused of breaching the Defence Finance regulations. When Mrs. Clayton spent her holiday in Monte Carlo he ran out of cash and after borrowing some from her host friend she still needed to pay her trip back to England. The friend called for Landau who offered to lend her money. Although her cheque was post-dated he gave £50 in an unusually high exchange rate. This deception was revealed to be related to Max Intrator, or "Palestine Max" an international warrant smuggler and cheque fraud who was arrested in the same month and who indirectly cashed in cheques worth more than £75, a sum that the post-war Treasury allowed to be spent abroad. People who accepted cheques from British subjects on the Continent on behalf of Intrator were believed to be aware of the currency crime circle and thus got prosecuted.

Personal life
After World War II Landau worked as a secretary of the Monte Carlo Tennis Club. He married Janine Marie-Louise Regnart on January 26, 1945 in Paris. The same year their son Patrick Landau was born who later also became a tennis player and a member of the Monaco Davis Cup team. Later Patrick was drafted to the US Junior Davis Cup team where he was coached by his father who was the team captain as well. He studied in the Brigham Young University where he trained in the BYU Cougars. There he was the Western Athletic Conference tennis singles and team champion. He was also the singles and doubles champion of Monaco (also junior champion before), Durham doubles champion and runner-up in French Junior Championships. Vladimir died on September 24, 1971 in Hannover but was buried in Monaco five weeks later.

References

External links
 
 

1902 births
1971 deaths
Monegasque male tennis players
Sportspeople from Saint Petersburg
Naturalized citizens of Monaco
Emigrants from the Russian Empire to Monaco
Emigrants from the Russian Empire to Germany